is a Japanese fencer. She competed in the women's individual and team épée events at the 1996 Summer Olympics.

References

External links
 

1975 births
Living people
Japanese female épée fencers
Olympic fencers of Japan
Fencers at the 1996 Summer Olympics
People from Chiba (city)
20th-century Japanese women